Garshuni or Karshuni (Syriac alphabet: ,) are Arabic writings using the Syriac alphabet. The word "Garshuni", derived from the word "grasha" which literally translates as "pulling", was used by George Kiraz to coin the term "garshunography", denoting the writing of one language in the script of another.

History
Garshuni originated in the seventh century, when Arabic was becoming the dominant spoken language in the Fertile Crescent, but the Arabic alphabet was not yet fully developed. There is evidence that writing Arabic in Garshuni influenced the style of modern Arabic script.

After this initial period, Garshuni writing has continued to the present day among some Syriac Christian communities in the Arabic-speaking regions of the Levant and Mesopotamia, who commonly use the Sertâ script.

Characteristics
The Syriac alphabet has three principal varieties:
 Estrangelâ (the Classical Syriac script),
 Madnhâyâ (the Eastern Syriac script, often called "Assyrian" or "Nestorian"),
 Sertâ (the Western Syriac script, often called "Jacobite" or "Maronite").

The Syriac alphabet is extended by use of diacritics to write Arabic Garshuni.

Similarities
Occasionally, other languages such as Turkish, Persian, Sogdian, the Kurdish languages and Malayalam have been written in the Syriac alphabet, and these are sometimes also referred to as "Garshunis". With several additional characters, the Malayalam version is better known as Karsoni and had been in use till early 20th century among the Keralite Syriac Christian clergymen and followers.

For the analogous Jewish practice of writing Arabic in Hebrew letters, see Judeo-Arabic languages.

Today, Assyrians use the word 'garshuni' when referring to a spoken language written using something other than its corresponding script, i.e. spoken Assyrian written using Latin script.

See also
Syriac language
Arabic
Karsoni
The Syro-Aramaic Reading of the Koran

Bibliography 
Briquel-Chatonnet, F., “De l'intérêt de l'étude du garshouni et des manuscrits écrits selon ce système” in: L’Orient chrétien dans l’empire musulman: Hommage au professeur Gérard Troupeau (Studia arabica III). Versailles: Editions de Paris, 2005, pp. 463–475.
Briquel-Chatonnet, F.; Desreumaux, A.; Binggeli, A., “Un cas très ancien de garshouni? Quelques réflexions sur le manuscrit BL Add. 14644” in: P. G. Borbone, A. Mengozzi, M. Tosco (éds.), Loquentes linguis. Studi linguistici e orientali in onore di Fabrizio A. Pennacchietti. Wiesbaden: Harrassowitz, 2006, pp. 141–147.
Mengozzi, A., “The History of Garshuni as a Writing System: Evidence from the Rabbula Codex” in: F. M. Fales & G. F. Grassi (eds), CAMSEMUD 2007. Proceedings of the 13th Italian Meeting of Afro-Asiatic Linguistics, held in Udine, May 21–24, 2007, Padova: S.A.R.G.O.N. Editrice e Libreria, 2010, pp. 297–304.
Mingana, A., “Garshūni or Karshūni?” in: Journal of the Royal Asiatic Society (1928) 891–893.
Morozov, D.A., “Garshuni: Syriac script in Christian Arabic texts” (in Russian: “Karshuni: Sirijskaja pisjmennostj v arabo-hristianskih tekstah”) in: 5-je chtenija pamiati N. F. Kaptereva: Rossija i pravoslavnyj Vostok (Moscow, 30-31 Oct. 2007). Moscow, 2007, pp. 70–72. 
Ram, H., Qiṣṣat Mar Eliĭa (Die Legende vom Hl. Elias). Als Beitrag zur Kenntnis der arabischen Vulgar-Dialekte Mesopotamiens nach der Handschrift Kod. Sachau 15 der Konigl. Bibliothek zu Berlin herausgegeben, ubersetzt und mit einer Schriftlehre versehen. Inaugural-Dissertation. Leipzig, 1906.
Seleznyov, Nikolai N., “Un clerc syro-occidental d’Arfad et le métropolitain de Jérusalem, de l’Église de l’Orient: Le livre “De l’unanimité de la foi” et sa recension en garshuni" (in Russian: “Zapadnosirijskij knizhnik iz Afrada i ijerusalimskij mitropolit Cerkvi Vostoka: “Kniga obschnosti very” i jejo rukopisnaja redakcija na karshuni") in: Symbol 58: Syriaca et Arabica. Paris-Moscow, 2010, pp. 34–87 (text in Garshuni: pp. 45–72).

References

External links 
 Commentary on Pentateuch(Torah) / Manuscript on Garshuni
 "The Unique Explanation of the Secrets' is a manuscript in Garshuni, dating back to 1740
 
Garshuni works at the World Digital Library
Syriac–Garshuni glossary

Syriac alphabet
Syriac Christianity
Arabic language